L'Enfant prodigue (French for "The Prodigal Son") was the first feature-length motion picture produced in Europe, running 90 minutes. Directed by Michel Carré, from his own three-act stage pantomime, The Prodigal Son.  The film was basically an unmodified filmed record of his play.  Filmed at the Gaumont Film Company studios in May 1907.

The movie premiered at the Théâtre des Variétés on the Boulevard Montmartre, in Paris, on 20 June 1907.

Carré directed another film version of L'Enfant prodigue in 1916.

Cast (in credits order)
Georges Wague
Henri Gouget
Christiane Mandelys
Gilberte Sergy

References

External links 
 

1907 films
French black-and-white films
French silent feature films
1900s French films